Synaptotagmin-7 is a protein that in humans is encoded by the SYT7 gene.

Function 

Synaptotagmins, such as SYT7, are calcium-dependent phospholipid-binding proteins known for their role in synaptic exocytosis and neurotransmitter release. Significant expression has also been observed in the prostate and other tissues. See MIM 600782 [supplied by OMIM]

Interactions 

SYT7 has been shown to interact with SYNCRIP.

References

Further reading

External links